Cardiff Athletic Club (CAC) is a multi-sport club based in Cardiff, Wales. It is the owner of the Cardiff Arms Park site, however, it is also a major shareholder of Cardiff Rugby Football Club Ltd and therefore has a large influence over the rugby club's two sides.  

Cardiff Athletic Club was established in 1922, and has been the main body responsible for much of the premier amateur sporting activities in Cardiff.  The Athletic Club has cricket, rugby union, field hockey, tennis and bowls sections.

History

In 1922 Cardiff Football Club, later renamed Cardiff Rugby Football Club, and Cardiff Cricket Club amalgamated to form the Cardiff Athletic Club.  Before that in 1878, the two Clubs had been granted the use of Cardiff Arms Park at a peppercorn rate, by the 3rd Marquess of Bute, who owned the site at the time. The two clubs wanted to preserve their grounds, and so the cricket and rugby clubs joined forces, and created Cardiff Athletic Club.  The Athletic Club purchased the site from the 4th Marquess of Bute, apart from a strip of land adjoining Westgate Street, for £30,000 on the understanding that the site should be preserved for recreational purposes only. By 1935, the 4th Marquis of Bute built a new block of flats on his land adjoining Westgate Street.

There had been previous attempts to merge the clubs, in November 1892 and between 1902 and 1904, when the two clubs worked closely to fund a new pavilion to serve the needs of both clubs, but it was not until 1922 that the merger finally took place.  Later the Cardiff Arms Park Company Limited was formed by Cardiff Athletic Club, Arms Park (Cardiff) Greyhound Racing Company Limited and the Welsh Rugby Union (WRU). By 1933 the Cardiff Athletic Club acquired a 99-year lease from the Cardiff Arms Park Company Limited on a rental of £200 per annum.

Since the 1930s, Cardiff Arms Park has changed considerably, with new facilities and amenities, but it was the building of the National Stadium which would see the greatest change for the Cardiff Athletic Club.  After an agreement between Cardiff Athletic Club and the WRU, the freehold of the rugby ground was transferred solely to the WRU in July 1968. Work could then begin on the new National Stadium.  Glamorgan County Cricket Club and the cricket and hockey sections of the Athletic Club moved to Sophia Gardens in 1967, and by 1995 the cricket section moved again to the Diamond Ground in Whitchurch, Cardiff., although the hockey section still play at the Sophia Gardens complex.  This allowed the cricket ground to be demolished and a new rugby union stadium built on the same site for Cardiff RFC, who would move out of the old rugby ground, allowing the National Stadium to be built, for the sole use of the Wales national rugby union team. By 1999, the National Stadium had been replaced by the Millennium Stadium.

Present day 

Cardiff Athletic Club has five sports sections; the rugby section (administered by Cardiff Blues Ltd, with Cardiff Athletic Club as its major shareholder), the cricket section (Cardiff Cricket Club), the (field) hockey section (Cardiff & Met Hockey Club including the Cardiff Athletic Ladies Hockey Club), the bowls section (Cardiff Athletic Bowls Club) and the tennis section (Lisvane (CAC) Tennis Club).  Each section is represented on the Management Committee of the Club. The Athletic Club is one of the few multi-sport clubs in the United Kingdom.  A former president of Cardiff Athletic Club was the ex-Welsh International rugby player Bleddyn Williams.  

It was announced on 19 September 2007, that the Cardiff Blues team were to move from Cardiff Arms Park for the 2009–2010 season, to a new stadium at Leckwith to become tenants of Cardiff City FC.  The Cardiff Athletic Club management committee at the time had voted to support this. A decision by Cardiff Athletic Club on the future of Cardiff Arms Park could be made later.

Cardiff Arms Park Male Choir

The Arms Park has its own choir, called the Cardiff Arms Park Male Choir.  It was formed in 1966 as the Cardiff Athletic Club Male Voice Choir, and today performs internationally with a schedule of concerts and tours. In 2000, the choir changed their name to become the Cardiff Arms Park Male Choir.

Images

See also 
Sport in Cardiff

Notes

External links
Official website of Cardiff Athletic Club
Official website of Cardiff Arms Park Male Choir
Cardiff Athletic Bowls Club
Cardiff Cricket Club
Cardiff and Met Hockey Club
Cardiff RFC (Cardiff Rugby Football Club Ltd)
Lisvane (CAC) Tennis Club

Sports clubs established in 1922
Multi-sport clubs in the United Kingdom
Sport in Cardiff